Antennas to Hell is the first greatest hits compilation album by American heavy metal band Slipknot. The album was released on July 23, 2012, in the United Kingdom and July 24, 2012, in the United States by Roadrunner Records. The title is a reference to the critically acclaimed post-rock album Lift Your Skinny Fists Like Antennas to Heaven, released by the band Godspeed You! Black Emperor in 2000. The album features hit singles, fan favorites, and live tracks. The two-disc version of Antennas to Hell features a bonus live CD capturing Slipknot's performance at the 2009 Download Festival in Donington Park, England. The three-disc version includes a bonus DVD featuring every Slipknot music video and ten brand new video features, titled "Broadcasts from Hell", created by Shawn Crahan. It is the first album released by the band since late bassist Paul Gray's death in 2010. Despite being a greatest hits collection, Clown of Slipknot has stated that it's more of a tribute to what Slipknot were and used to be at the time of the songs, and also said that the collection comes with much artwork and DVD content.

Reception

Critical

Antennas to Hell has been very well received by critics. Rick Florino of Artistdirect stated that, "Their track record continues to be flawless and, unlike many of their contemporaries, they've outlasted nu metal, metalcore, and any other trends imaginable. They're rock's proverbial last men standing, and Antennas to Hell perfectly covers their now legendary career with highlights from each release and some mind-blowing bonuses."

Commercial
The album debuted at number 18 on the U.S. Billboard 200 with sales of more than 16,000 copies in its first week.

Artwork
The cover art features a dark sky blue background with the devil's head. The band's "S" logo is also seen above the head. The back cover features a black background and one of the devil's horns. On the inside, the CD tray features the late Paul Gray's blue house. The address says 6421 and also a half 6421. The doors are a wooden door and a screen door. The screen door leads to Gray's home and the wooden door leads to the room where the cover artwork was taken. The back of the booklet features a replica of the devil's head on a table. The CD shows a concrete background with black nails scattered all over the place.

Track listing

Personnel

(#8) Corey Taylor – vocals, acoustic guitar on "Snuff"
(#7) Mick Thomson – guitars
(#6) Shawn Crahan – percussion, backing vocals
(#5) Craig Jones – samples, media, keyboards
(#4) Josh Brainard - guitars 
(#4) Jim Root – guitars 
(#3) Greg “Cuddles” Welts - percussion, backing vocals 
(#3) Chris Fehn – percussion, backing vocals
(#2) Paul Gray – bass, backing vocals
(#1) Joey Jordison – drums
(#0) Sid Wilson – turntables, keyboards

Charts and certifications

Charts

Certifications

References

2012 greatest hits albums
Slipknot (band) albums
Roadrunner Records compilation albums
Albums produced by Ross Robinson
Albums produced by Rick Rubin
Albums produced by Dave Fortman
Albums produced by Chris Vrenna